The 1976–77 UCLA Bruins men's basketball team represented the University of California, Los Angeles in the  NCAA Division I men's basketball season. In his second and final year as head coach, Gene Bartow and the Bruins began the season ranked fourth in the AP Poll and won the Pac-8 regular season with an 11–3 record.

Ranked second and 23–4  UCLA accepted a bid to the NCAA tournament; they  defeated fourteenth-ranked Louisville in the first round in Pocatello, Idaho, and remained at second in the  In the West Regional semifinals (Sweet Sixteen) at Provo, Utah, the Bruins were upset by a point by unranked  Failing to make the Final Four broke a record streak of these appearances going back to 1966.

Senior forward Marques Johnson was a consensus

Starting lineup

Roster

Schedule

|-
!colspan=9 style=|Regular Season

|-
!colspan=12 style="background:#;"| NCAA Tournament

Source:

References

External links
Sports Reference – UCLA Bruins – 1976–77 basketball season
YouTube – Idaho State upsets UCLA, from Big Sky 50 Greatest Moments – from NBC Sports telecast

UCLA Bruins men's basketball seasons
Ucla
Ucla
UCLA
UCLA